Jean-François Ducay (born 22 June 1979) is a former French para table tennis player. He has participated in the Paralympic Games three times and has won three medals.

References

External links 
 
 

1979 births
Living people
French male table tennis players
Paralympic table tennis players of France
Paralympic gold medalists for France
Paralympic silver medalists for France
Paralympic medalists in table tennis
Table tennis players at the 2008 Summer Paralympics
Table tennis players at the 2012 Summer Paralympics
Table tennis players at the 2016 Summer Paralympics
Medalists at the 2008 Summer Paralympics
Medalists at the 2012 Summer Paralympics
Medalists at the 2016 Summer Paralympics
20th-century French people
21st-century French people